The term Free China, in the context of the Second Sino-Japanese War, refers to those areas of China not under the control of the Imperial Japanese Army or any of its puppet governments, such as Manchukuo, the Mengjiang government in Suiyuan and Chahar, or the Provisional Government of the Republic of China in Peiping (now Beijing). The term came into more frequent use after the Battle of Nanjing, when Chiang Kai-shek evacuated the government of the Republic of China to Chungking (now Chongqing).

History
In the final days of the Battle of Nanking, the Republic of China's National Revolutionary Army helped to evacuate the Chiang Kai-shek government to Chungking (the former spelling for Chongqing), which was declared the provisional capital of the Republic of China. The Japanese, following their victory at Nanking (now Nanjing), created yet another puppet government, the Reformed Government of the Republic of China, which was later merged with the Provisional Government of the Republic of China to create the Wang Jingwei Government. Many civilians from Japanese-controlled areas of China fled to Free China.

Conflict between the Communists and Nationalists continued in the area of Free China, the most severe example being the New Fourth Army Incident. At the same time, Japanese action against the Communists and Nationalists continued; Chungking was bombed 268 times, making it the most-bombed city in all of World War II, and, even as late as December 1944, the Japanese Operation Ichigo succeeded in taking control of Guangxi, giving them a continuous railway link between Manchukuo and Southeast Asia. The Japanese also prepared to invade Szechuan (Sichuan) in an attempt to destroy the regime in Chungking and take ultimate control of mainland China; however, they were forced to surrender before this plan had succeeded.

The term "Free area of the Republic of China" was later reused by the Nationalist government after their retreat to Taiwan to contrast their territory with that of the People's Republic of China.

Bibliography
 
  See chapter 2, "Escape to Free China".
 

1937 establishments in China
1945 disestablishments in China
Second Sino-Japanese War
Military history of China during World War II
History of Chongqing